Danish Palaces or Danish palaces may refer to:
Danish Palaces (Fabergé egg)
List of Danish royal residences
List of castles and palaces in Denmark